Pollaiolo or Pollaiuolo is the name of several people, including:

 Antonio del Pollaiuolo (1429/1433–1498), Italian Renaissance artist
 Piero del Pollaiuolo (1443–1496), Italian Renaissance artist, brother of Antonio
 Simone del Pollaiolo (1457–1508), Italian Renaissance architect, nephew of Antonio and Piero.

See also
 Carlo Francesco Pollarolo (1653–1723), Italian composer.